Jeff Brown is the former head men’s tennis coach at Louisiana State University. Brown succeeded Jerry Simmons in 1998 and had an overall record of 312–205 and 116–116 in the SEC in twenty seasons as head coach of the Tigers before retiring in 2017. His teams played in 9 consecutive NCAA Tournaments, reaching the semifinals in 1998 and 1999.  His 1998 and 1999 teams were SEC regular season and tournament champions.

References

External links
LSU Tigers bio 

Year of birth missing (living people)
Living people
American male tennis players
American tennis coaches
LSU Tigers tennis coaches
LSU Tigers tennis players